Basil Clement Thompson (23 November 1934 – 13 March 2011) was a Burmese boxer. He competed in the men's flyweight event at the 1952 Summer Olympics. He lost to Al Asuncion of the Philippines in his first match.

References

External links
 

1934 births
2011 deaths
Sportspeople from Yangon
Burmese male boxers
Olympic boxers of Myanmar
Boxers at the 1952 Summer Olympics
Flyweight boxers
Anglo-Burmese people
Burmese emigrants to the United States
American people of Anglo-Burmese descent